The Nkout mine is a large iron mine located in south Cameroon in the South Region. Nkout represents one of the largest iron ore reserves in Cameroon and in the world having estimated reserves of 3 billion tonnes of iron ore. In 2013, IMIC signed an agreement with Hebei Iron & Steel for offtake of iron ore production.

See also 

 List of mines in Cameroon
 List of iron mines

References 

Iron ore deposits
Iron mines in Cameroon
South Region (Cameroon)